Tolgahan Mulla Çiçek (born 19 June 1995) is a professional footballer who plays as a left back for TFF Third League side Osmaniyespor FK. Born in the Netherlands, he represented Turkey at under-21 international level.

Club career
From 2014, Çiçek was part of the first team of De Graafschap, who signed him from the youth academy of Groningen. On 16 August 2014, Çiçek made his professional debut by filling in for Caner Cavlan eight minutes before the final whistle against Almere City. On 25 September, he made his first start in the cup match against DOSKO. In the 2017–18 season he played for Adana Demirspor. In August 2019, he moved to Nevşehir Belediyespor in the TFF Third League. After a year, he signed with Niğde Anadolu playing in the TFF Second League.

International career
Tolgahan is born in Netherlands to parents of Turkish descent, and originally represented the Netherlands U15 team. However, he later represented the Turkey U21 team and made his debut in a 1-0 loss to the Cyprus U21s.

References

External links
 

1995 births
People from Delfzijl
Footballers from Groningen (province)
Dutch people of Turkish descent
Living people
Dutch footballers
Netherlands youth international footballers
Turkish footballers
Turkey youth international footballers
Association football fullbacks
De Graafschap players
Adana Demirspor footballers
Niğde Anadolu FK footballers
Hacettepe S.K. footballers
Eredivisie players
Eerste Divisie players
Derde Divisie players
TFF First League players
TFF Second League players
TFF Third League players